Sir John Henry MacFarland (19 April 1851 – 22 July 1935) was an Irish–Australian university chancellor.

MacFarland was born in Omagh, County Tyrone, Ireland and educated at the Royal Academical Institution, Belfast. He was senior scholar in Mathematics and Natural Philosophy at Queen's College, Belfast, where he was taught by John Purser.  There he earned a BA in 1871 and MA in 1872.  Moving to St. John's College, Cambridge, he was elected a foundation scholar, and earned a second BA, as 26th wrangler, in 1876.  He also got an MA there in 1879.

MacFarland taught at Repton School in Derbyshire from 1876 to 1880.  (A decade later, his younger brother Robert (1860-1922), also a Queen's Belfast and Cambridge maths graduate, would teach at Repton.) In 1881, he became the first master of Ormond College in the University of Melbourne. In 1919, he became chancellor of the university and was knighted the same year. In 1892, the Royal University of Ireland had bestowed upon him an honorary LLD degree.

MacFarland became a director of the National Mutual Life Association c. 1905 and was chairman from 1928. He died in Melbourne, Victoria, Australia on 22 July 1935.

References

Serle, Geoffrey. MacFarland, Sir John Henry (1851 - 1935), Australian Dictionary of Biography, Vol. 10, MUP, 1986, pp 266–267. Retrieved 8 January 2014

External links
 

1851 births
1935 deaths
Australian educational theorists
Irish emigrants to colonial Australia
Alumni of St John's College, Cambridge
Vice-Chancellors of the University of Melbourne
Chancellors of the University of Melbourne
Australian Knights Bachelor
People from Omagh
People educated at the Royal Belfast Academical Institution
Alumni of Queen's University Belfast